Ovarian Cancer Research Alliance (OCRA) is a not-for-profit organization focused on ovarian cancer research, advocacy and patient support. The organization was formed in January 2016 when the former not-for-profit organization Ovarian Cancer Research Fund, which focused primarily on ovarian cancer research, combined with Ovarian Cancer National Alliance, which focused primarily on ovarian cancer advocacy and support programs, to form one organization.

History 
The former Ovarian Cancer Research Fund (OCRF) was founded in December 1994, as the Ann Schreiber Ovarian Cancer Research Fund by Sol Schreiber in memory of his wife, Ann, who died of ovarian cancer. The organization later became the Ovarian Cancer Research Fund. In 1997, Liz Tilberis, editor-in-chief of Harper's Bazaar and also battling ovarian cancer, became the organization's first president. Tilberis, with help from Donna Karan, started the organization's signature fundraiser, Super Saturday, hosting the first one in 1998 in the Hamptons in New York. Prior to becoming Ovarian Cancer Research Fund Alliance, Ovarian Cancer Research Fund was the oldest and largest charity in the United States funding ovarian cancer research.

The former Ovarian Cancer National Alliance (OCNA) was founded in 1997 by the leaders of several ovarian cancer organizations. Prior to becoming the eventual merge of the two organizations, OCNA was a leading ovarian cancer organization in the United States focusing on federal advocacy, awareness and patient support programs.

Research 

As of December 2018, since inception of the original organization, OCRA has awarded 297 research grants to scientists at 73 medical institutions, totaling over $80 million.

The majority of ovarian cancer research funding in the United States comes from two government sources—the National Cancer Institute and United States Department of Defense. OCRA is the largest non-governmental funding source of ovarian cancer research. OCRA research grants are approved by a committee of gynecologic oncologists and scientists treating or studying ovarian cancer.

Grant-making programs 
Through grant-making programs, OCRA funds scientific research at cancer centers and academic research centers in the U.S. The first grants were awarded in 1998. OCRFA offers three research grants:

 Collaborative Research Development Grant: OCRFA's largest grant ($900,000 over three years) is for senior investigators with established research careers, and provides funding for large ovarian cancer research projects that involve several investigators within one institution or collaborations between groups in multiple institutions. ($300,000 per year for three years)
 Liz Tilberis Early Career Award: This award is for junior faculty, and supports a time commitment to research and academic endeavors in ovarian cancer. ($150,000 per year for three years).
 Ann and Sol Schreiber Mentored Investigator Award: This award was created in 2003, and funds clinical fellows or post-doctoral fellows working under the supervision of a mentor who is considered a leader in the field of ovarian cancer research. ($75,000 over one or two years)
Rosalind Franklin Prize for Excellence in Ovarian Cancer Research: This annual award was introduced in 2005 in honour of Rosalind Franklin, discoverer of key chemical properties for the correct description of the structure of DNA and died of ovarian cancer in 1958.

OCRA selects research projects through a peer-review process, conducted once each year by a panel of advisors called the Scientific Advisory Committee, which is chaired by Jeff Boyd of the Florida International University and Miami Cancer Institute.

Less than 10% of applicants are awarded grants. Institutions that have received the most grants include University of Texas MD Anderson Cancer Center, University of Pennsylvania, Fox Chase Cancer Center, Duke University, and Brigham and Women's Hospital.

OCRA presents an educational webinar series featuring speakers on topics in ovarian cancer research and addresses clinical trial enrollment with an ovarian cancer clinical trial finder on its website.

Advocacy 
OCRA works with federal policy makers, including the President, Congress, and federal agencies like the Food and Drug Administration (FDA) and the Centers for Medicare and Medicaid Services (CMS). OCRA commits its resources to be a voice for ovarian cancer survivors and to significantly reduce the number of deaths from this deadly disease by advocating at the federal level for:

 Adequate and sustained funding for ovarian cancer research and awareness programs.
 Legislation that improves quality of life and access to care for cancer patients.

Advocacy Day 
Advocacy Day takes place on Capitol Hill. Ovarian cancer survivors meet one-on-one with elected officials to share their personal stories as well as ask for support on a number of federal efforts aimed at sustaining or increasing funding for federal ovarian cancer research, awareness and support.

Support 
OCRA's support programs focus on helping women and their families before, during and beyond diagnosis.

Survivors Teaching Students: Saving Women's Lives 
Survivors Teaching Students: Saving Women's Lives aims to educate future healthcare professionals—physicians, nurse practitioners, nurses and physician assistants—to increase their understanding of ovarian cancer symptoms and risk factors so that they will be able to diagnose the disease when it is in its earlier, most treatable stages.

Ovarian Cancer National Conference 
The OCRFA Ovarian Cancer National Conference provides expert sessions on topics such as clinical trials, early detection, and treatment through various forums and lectures from renowned clinicians and researchers. Survivors and their families also can attend workshops and events on issues about living with ovarian cancer.

Woman to Woman Program 
In 2011 the former OCRF began a national expansion of Woman to Woman, a local program originating at Mount Sinai Hospital. This program pairs volunteer gynecologic cancer survivors with women recently diagnosed and actively going through treatment, and offers information and support for caregivers. Woman to Woman program sites are selected through an application process. OCRFA gives each selected institution a one-year, $50,000 grant to cover the cost of a part-time program coordinator, with remaining funds allotted to a patient fund. Newly established Woman to Woman programs are expected to become self-funding after the first year.

Community Partner Program 
OCRFA works with not-for-profit organizations across the United States to share information and put forth a unified national voice for the ovarian cancer movement. This program was established by the former Ovarian Cancer National Alliance and was formerly called the Partner Member Program.

Events 

The first OCRF ovarian cancer awareness broadcast and print public service announcements were created in partnership with L'Oréal and featured Andie MacDowell. Since then, OCRA has been included in print and online publications, including books, national and international magazines and local newspapers, as a resource for ovarian cancer information.

Contributions to public discourse on ovarian cancer in are done through various forums, including Letters to the Editor in The New York Times.

The organization has four signature events. The earliest established, called Super Saturday, is an annual fundraiser held in Water Mill, New York. Super Saturday was founded in 1998 by fashion designer Donna Karan, and late OCRF President and Editor-In-Chief of Harper's Bazaar, Liz Tilberis. It is dubbed the "Rolls-Royce of garage sales" by The New York Times, and has been hosted by Kelly Ripa and sponsored by Donna Karan, QVC and InStyle. Super Saturday includes a "garage sale" of new designer products, a live on-site QVC broadcast, a children's carnival, and other activities. In 2013, Super Saturday raised $3.5 million for Ovarian Cancer Research Fund.

The Legends Gala was sponsored for several years by L'Oréal Paris, and is held every other year. A 2011 Gala was held at the American Museum of Natural History, and was hosted by Julianna Margulies. The gala has raised nearly $19 million since 2002, and typically honors individuals from a range of industries. Past honorees have included Sherry Lansing, Trudie Styler, Terry Lundgren, and Kathy Black.

A signature "Stand Up for Madeline and OCRA" comedy event is held annually in tribute to Madeline Kahn, who died from ovarian cancer. Her husband, John W. Hansbury, joined the Board of Directors of Ovarian Cancer Research Fund and created the comedy event which is held at Carolines on Broadway.

In 2012, Ovarian Cycle, formerly an independent 501(c)(3) nonprofit, became a signature event series of the organization. Ovarian Cycle had previously held indoor cycling events to raise money for ovarian cancer research with the organization a national charity recipient of a portion of Ovarian Cycle's annual fundraising.

Partners 

Through corporate sponsorships and cause-marketing campaigns, the organization has received support from a variety of companies. Some sponsors have included QVC, L'Oréal Paris, Electrolux, Alex and Ani, and LeSportsac.

Accountability 

Ovarian Cancer Research Alliance has a four-star rating from independent charity evaluator Charity Navigator, and ranks among the top 10% of all four-star rated charities. OCRA is also a Better Business Bureau Accredited Charity that meets the BBB Wise Giving Alliance accreditation standards for charity accountability, and has had their seal since 2010. Ovarian Cancer Research Alliance is a Silver-level GuideStar Exchange participant. In October 2012, Self magazine ranked then-OCRF as one of the three best cancer charities.

References

External links 

 "Ovarian Cancer, The Stealthy Specter," Hour Detroit, September 2012, Monica Mercer
 "Confronting the Silent Killer," The Jewish Week, October 10, 2012, Elecia Brown
 No Time to Die: Living with Ovarian Cancer, Liz Tilberis, Harper Collins, 1999

Ovarian cancer
Cancer charities in the United States
Charities based in New York City
Medical and health organizations based in New York (state)